Bonnie Loo (born 12 July 1994) is a Malaysian actress and singer based in Singapore managed under The Celebrity Agency.

Early life
Loo was born in Ipoh, Malaysia, and is the elder of two daughters. She began to take singing lessons when she was 10 years old, and enrolled in numerous singing competitions in the Asia Pacific region since the age of 6. Her family emigrated to Singapore when she was 12 years old both for her higher education and her father's job posting to Singapore. She graduated with a Singapore-Cambridge GCE Ordinary Level from Riverside Secondary School.

Career
She rose to fame in 2013 where she participated and won the fourth season of Campus SuperStar, one of the Chinese singing competitions held in Singapore. Her victory made the series' history since the show began in 2006 as the first female winner, and her grand prize included a two-year Mediacorp management contract, $5,000 cash and the opportunity to perform with Taiwan-based singer Ding Dang in Glass Anatomy The Musical.

Acting career
In November 2013, Loo announced that she would be starring in Singaporean television series C.L.I.F. 3 as Yang Hongxi, the daughter of Terence Cao's role, and would be part of a Chinese New Year compilation album in a song together with Julie Tan, Jayley Woo, Ian Fang and Shane Pow in 2014.

Loo announced that she would be starring in a drama entitled Against The Tide in March 2014.

In an article by The Straits Times in October 2014, she was labelled as one of the four rising female artistes to look out for in the local entertainment scene.

On 2 November 2014, Loo performed for President Star Charity 2014 in a dance segment as part of a challenge between artistes of different genders.

In 2015, Bonnie starred the drama Second Chance 流氓律师 and then went on to star in the drama entitled Tiger Mum. She later acted in Crescendo 起飞, taking the role as the younger version of Cynthia Koh's character. She had also filmed the a long-form drama, Life - Fear Not 人生无所畏. Meanwhile, she was cast in House of Fortune 钱来运转, which aired in January 2016.

In 2016, Loo was given a role in The Dream Job, acting as Rebecca Lim's physically disabled younger sister.

Her performance in Tiger Mum as Chen Huiyan earned her a Best Supporting Actress nomination in the Star Awards 2016.

Bonnie reprised her role as Yang Hongxi in C.L.I.F. 4 in 2016. She also took part in Hero and "Soul Reaper" in 2016. Her role as Guan Meimei in "Hero" won her a second Best Supporting Actress nomination in the Star Awards 2017.

In 2017, she filmed Mightiest Mother-in-Law for which she achieved a third Best Supporting Actress nomination. She finished filming her first leading role in My Teacher Is a Thug.

She appeared in Life Less Ordinary which was first broadcast on 2 October 2017.

In 2018, she filmed in Limited Edition and You Can Be An Angel 3. She has wrapped a production Super Dad which have already broadcast in 2020.

In 2019, she filmed C.L.I.F. 5, where she gained her 4th nomination for Best Supporting Actress. She also filmed another long-form drama Old Is Gold, 
Walk With Me &
Limited Edition.

In 2020, she filmed	Best Friends Forever, Super Dad?,
How are you today? and 
A Jungle Survivor.

In 2021, she filmed	Crouching Tiger Hidden Ghost, The Heartland Hero and 
Key Witness which will broadcast in 2021.

In Star Awards 2021, Loo obtained her first Top 10 Most Popular Female Artistes award.

Music career
Since Campus Superstar, Loo has appeared in other television shows and concerts. She was guest star for The Sheng Siong Show on 9 June. On 13 July, she performed at the PAssion Pop Concert, part of the People's Association's PAssion Around The Bay. She appeared as special guest during the finals of Hey Gorgeous, a campus talent search on 15 July.

Subsequently, Loo was signed to one of Asia's key music labels, S2S Pte. Ltd., as a result of her win on Campus SuperStar. During an interview, Loo mentioned that she would take a break from her studies and embark on her singing career after completing her GCE O-Level examinations.

From 24 July to 3 August 2014, she starred in Innamorati.

On 30 September 2014, Loo released her first single, entitled "Don’t Want To Admit" (不想承认), which is included in her debut album, "Bonnie 羅美儀", which was released on 2 October 2014. Her second single was "YOLO".

In May 2015, she appeared in auditions for the fourth season of The Voice of China, but was not chosen to represent Singapore in the actual competition.

She featured in The Crescendo Concert on 14 November 2015. The concert traced the evolution of Singapore Mandarin music.

She was nominated in the Star Awards 2016 for the Best Theme Song for "未知数" in "Tiger Mum".

Subsequently, Loo was nominated for Best Theme Song in the Star Awards in 2016, with "未知数". She also released a cover of Korean song "Banmal Song" and a music video of "守护你" and "等一等爱情", from Drama Hero.

In 2017, she was selected for "Crescendo The Musical", based on Crescendo in which she reprised her role as Ya Fang.

On 9 December 2017, Loo held her first music showcase (美仪首歌) at the 2mm Talent Hub. She held a second music showcase, "Bonnie's Tribute to Singapore Music" (美仪首歌2), as part of Esplanade's Huayi - Chinese Festival of Arts on 1 March 2018.

Filmography

Television series

Variety series

Music video appearances

Discography

Studio albums

Compilation albums

Singles

Drama Soundtracks

Theatre

Awards and nominations

References

1994 births
Living people
Malaysian emigrants to Singapore
Malaysian people of Hakka descent
21st-century Malaysian women singers
Malaysian Mandopop singers
Malaysian television actresses